Count of Lerín is a hereditary title in the Peerage of Spain accompanied by the dignity of Grandee and of Constable of Navarre, granted in 1424 by Charles III to Luis de Beaumont, grandchild of Louis of Évreux and a great-grandchild of Joan III of Navarre.

Counts of Lerín

 Luis de Beaumont, 1st Count of Lerín
 Luis de Beaumont, 2nd Count of Lerín
 Luis de Beaumont, 3rd Count of Lerín
 Luis de Beaumont, 4th Count of Lerín
 Brianda de Beaumont, 5th Countess of Lerín
 Antonio Álvarez de Toledo, 6th Count of Lerín
 Fernando Álvarez de Toledo y Mendoza, 7th Count of Lerín
 Antonio Álvarez de Toledo y Enriquez de Ribera, 8th Count of Lerín
 Antonio Álvarez de Toledo y Fernández de Velasco, 9th Count of Lerín
 Antonio Martín Álvarez de Toledo y Guzmán, 10th Count of Lerín
 Nicolás Álvarez de Toledo y Ponce de León, 11th Count of Lerín
 Francisco Álvarez de Toledo y Silva, 12th Count of Lerín
 María Teresa Álvarez de Toledo y Haro, 13th Countess of Lerín
 Fernando de Silva y Álvarez de Toledo, 14th Count of Lerín
 María Cayetana de Silva y Álvarez de Toledo, 15th Countess of Lerín
 Carlos Miguel Fitz-James Stuart y Silva, 16th Count of Lerín
 Jacobo Fitz-James Stuart y Ventimiglia, 17th Count of Lerín
 Carlos María Fitz-James Stuart y Portocarrero, 18th Count of Lerín
 Jacobo Fitz-James Stuart y Falcó, 19th Count of Lerín
 Cayetana Fitz-James Stuart y Silva, 20th Countess of Lerín
 Carlos Fitz-James Stuart y Martínez de Irujo, 21st Count of Lerín

See also
List of current Grandees of Spain

References

Grandees of Spain
Counts of Spain
Lists of Spanish nobility